Tum Se Kehna Tha is a Pakistani television series first broadcast in 1995 on PTV. It was directed by Sahira Kazmi. The series was based on Hollywood film While You Were Sleeping and adapted by Syed Mohammad Ahmed for the screenplay, which marked his debut as a screenwriter. The series stars Marina Khan, Ali Haider and Farhan Ally Agha in main roles.

Cast 
 Marina Khan as Hira
 Ali Haider as Bilal
 Farhan Ally Agha as Saad
 Badar Khalil as Daadi
 Salma Zafar as Shamim
 Manzoor Qureshi as Sajjad
 Seemi Pasha as Meher
 Khawaja Akmal as Shams
 Nasreen Baqir as Bibi
 Capt. Sharif as Agha
 Nadeem Jafery as Gringo
 Umer Khalil as Hamza
 Najma Khatoon as Buwa
 Meena Naqvi as Seema
 Nashmia Ahmad as Amna

Production 
The series was adapted from 1995 Hollywood film While You Were Sleeping, starring Bill Pullman and Sandra Bullock. It marked Khan's first collaboration with Ahmed, later directed his scripts such as Tum Hi Tou Ho (2002) and Azar Ki Ayegi Baraat (2009).

References

External Links 
 

Pakistani television series
1995 television series debuts
Pakistani television series based on American television series